Tosh Zhang (born 23 May 1989) is a Singaporean actor and musician. Zhang is most well-known for his catchy songs which garnered millions of views on YouTube and for playing the role of 'Sergeant Ong' in the record-breaking Ah Boys to Men movie series by director Jack Neo.

Personal life
Tosh grew up in the northern heartlands of Singapore. At 12, he fell in love with Hiphop culture through breakdancing and he was eventually recruited to be a member of Singapore's legendary pioneer breakdancing crew Radikal Forze in his teenage years. He began his journey into show business around 2010 when he started vlogging on YouTube with Tosh13 as his username and after he completed his military service in 2011, he would soon break into the entertainment industry in late 2012 with the films Ah Boys to Men (2012) and Ah Boys to Men 2 (2013).

Business/Career
Tosh has since started a shop with friends in Queensway Shopping Centre called Cream Capsule, which opened on 30 January 2021. The shop sells various types of street clothing among other accessories.

Discography

Singles

Filmography

Film

Television series

Variety / Television show

Awards and nominations

Theater

External links

References

1989 births
Living people
Singaporean people of Chinese descent
Singaporean people of Hakka descent
21st-century Singaporean male actors
Singaporean male film actors
Singaporean male television actors